Beijing Yanjing Brewery is a brewing company founded in 1980 in Beijing, China. Yanjing Beer was designated as the official beer served at state banquets in the Great Hall of the People in February 1995.

The company produced 57.1 million hectoliters of beer in 2013, making it the 8th biggest brewery in the world and the 3rd biggest in China.

Products

The company produces a range of mainly pale lagers under the brand name Yanjing. Other brands include Liquan, Huiquan and Xuelu.

References

External links 
Yanjing Beer Website UK
Harbrew Imports LTD

Breweries in China
Food and drink companies based in Beijing
Manufacturing companies based in Beijing
Government-owned companies of China
Chinese beer brands
Chinese companies established in 1980
Food and drink companies established in 1980
Companies listed on the Shenzhen Stock Exchange